Zubiri may refer to

Surname
Ben Zubiri (1911–1969), Filipino composer, actor, and media personality
Claudio Sillero-Zubiri, British zoologist
Diana Zubiri (born 1985), Filipina actress
Jose Maria Zubiri Jr. (born 1940), Filipino politician and businessman
Jose Zubiri III (born 1963), Filipino politician
Juan Miguel Zubiri (born 1969), Filipino politician
Serafín Zubiri (born 1964), Spanish singer, composer and piano player
Xavier Zubiri (1898–1983), Spanish philosopher

Others
Zubiri, Navarre, a community in Navarra, Spain
Pimentel vs. Zubiri electoral protest, 2007 election protest in Philippines